Sophie Gagnant-Ferracci (born 1976) is a business lawyer. During the French presidential election of 2017, she headed Emmanuel Macron's staff. She is also the wife of French economist and Deputy Marc Ferracci.

Biographie 
In January 2016 she became the head of the staff of Emmanuel Macron at the ministry of Economy. She left her role when Emmanuel Macron resigned and became his chief aide in his movement (En Marche!) for the French presidential election of 2017.

References 

1976 births
Living people
21st-century French lawyers
La République En Marche! politicians
HEC Paris alumni